Sage is a census-designated place (CDP) in Riverside County, California, United States. It has a population of 3,370 according to the 2020 census. It is a rural community with a history of farming, ranching, and bee keeping dating back to 1893. Sage is known for its views, hiking, multi-habitat species preserves, and close proximity to the Temecula Valley Wine Country.

References

Unincorporated communities in Riverside County, California
Unincorporated communities in California